Jean-Pierre Guillemot (born 25 September 1950) is a French racing cyclist. He rode in the 1974 Tour de France.

References

1950 births
Living people
French male cyclists
Place of birth missing (living people)